Saddanathar Kovil is a Hindu Temple and located in Nallur, Jaffna, Sri Lanka.
This is an ancient temple and built in Sangiliyan Kingdom.

Hindu temples in Jaffna District